The 2016 IFSC Climbing World Championships, the 14th edition, were held in Paris, France from 14 to 18 September 2016.

Medal winners overview

Lead

Women 
75 athletes attended the women's lead competition.

Men 
104 athletes attended the men's lead competition.

Bouldering

Women 
87 athletes attended the women's bouldering competition.

Men 
123 athletes attended the men's bouldering competition.

Speed

Women 
46 athletes competed in the women's speed climbing event.

Men 
55 athletes competed in the men's speed climbing event.

Combined 
The Combined ranking offers an Overall comparison of Athletes across the three Sport Climbing disciplines of Bouldering, Lead and Speed. The formula is simple: competitors must compete in all three disciplines to qualify and are ranked based on the aggregate of their places in the individual disciplines, in ascending order (lowest score is best). Ties are broken by comparing the competitors’ best scores.

Women

Men

References 

IFSC Climbing World Championships
World Climbing Championships
International sports competitions hosted by France